Vincenzo Saporiti (1606 – 2 January 1664) was a Roman Catholic prelate who served as Bishop of Nebbio (1646–1664).

Biography
Vincenzo Saporiti was born in 1606 in Monte Rosso, Italy. He was Doctor in utroque iure (Civil and Canon Law), Pisa. On 3 December 1646, Vincenzo Saporiti was appointed during the papacy of Pope Innocent X as Bishop of Nebbio. On 21 December 1646, he was consecrated bishop by Giulio Cesare Sacchetti, Cardinal-Priest of Santa Susanna. He served as Bishop of Nebbio until his death on 2 January 1664.

References 

17th-century Italian Roman Catholic bishops
Bishops appointed by Pope Innocent X
1606 births
1664 deaths